Boron tribromide, BBr3, is a colorless, fuming liquid compound containing boron and bromine. Commercial samples usually are amber to red/brown, due to weak bromine contamination. It is decomposed by water and alcohols.

Chemical properties
Boron tribromide is commercially available and is a strong Lewis acid.

It is an excellent demethylating or dealkylating agent for the cleavage of ethers, also with subsequent cyclization, often in the production of pharmaceuticals.

The mechanism of dealkylation of tertiary alkyl ethers  proceeds via the formation of a complex between the boron center and the ether oxygen followed by the elimination of an alkyl bromide to yield a dibromo(organo)borane.

ROR + BBr3 → RO+(−BBr3)R → ROBBr2 + RBr

Aryl methyl ethers (as well as activated primary alkyl ethers), on the other hand are dealkylated through a bimolecular mechanism involving two BBr3-ether adducts.

RO+(−BBr3)CH3 + RO+(−BBr3)CH3→   RO(−BBr3)  + CH3Br + RO+(BBr2)CH3

The dibromo(organo)borane can then undergo hydrolysis to give a hydroxyl group, boric acid, and hydrogen bromide as products.

ROBBr2 + 3H2O → ROH + B(OH)3 + 2HBr

It also finds applications in olefin polymerization and in Friedel-Crafts chemistry as a Lewis acid catalyst.

The electronics industry uses boron tribromide as a boron source in pre-deposition processes for doping in the manufacture of semiconductors.
Boron tribromide also mediates the dealkylation of aryl alkyl ethers, for example demethylation of 3,4-dimethoxystyrene into 3,4-dihydroxystyrene.

Synthesis
The reaction of boron carbide with bromine at temperatures above 300 °C leads to the formation of boron tribromide. The product can be purified by vacuum distillation.

History
The first synthesis was done by Poggiale in 1846 by reacting boron trioxide with carbon and bromine at high temperatures:

B2O3 + 3 C + 3 Br2  → 2 BBr3 + 3 CO

An improvement of this method was developed by F. Wöhler and Deville in 1857. By starting from amorphous boron the reaction temperatures are lower and no carbon monoxide is produced:

2 B + 3 Br2  → 2 BBr3

Applications
Boron tribromide is used in organic synthesis, pharmaceutical manufacturing, image processing, semiconductor doping, semiconductor plasma etching, and photovoltaic manufacturing.

See also
 List of highly toxic gases

References

Further reading

External links
 Boron Tribromide at The Periodic Table of Videos (University of Nottingham)
 NIOSH Pocket Guide to Chemical Hazards - Boron Tribromide (Centers for Disease Control and Prevention)
 
 

Boron compounds
Bromides
Boron halides
Acid catalysts